Ignatius John Doggett (born 1907 in Rydal, New South Wales) was an Australian clergyman and bishop for the Roman Catholic Diocese of Aitape. He studied at Holy Cross College in Sydney and was ordained in Rome in July 1933. He was appointed bishop in 1964. He died in 2004.

References 

1907 births
2004 deaths
Australian Roman Catholic bishops
Roman Catholic bishops of Aitape